Thomas Fermore alias Draper or Farmer (died 1609), of Great Marlow, Buckinghamshire, was an English politician.

He was a Member of Parliament (MP) for Chipping Wycombe in 1563.

References

16th-century births
1609 deaths
People from Great Marlow
English MPs 1563–1567